Ullastrell is a village in the province of Barcelona and autonomous community of Catalonia, Spain. The population in 2014 was 2,056.

References

External links
 Government data pages 

Municipalities in Vallès Occidental